Zsolt Szabó (born 30 April 1986 in Győr) is a Hungarian football player who currently plays for Soproni VSE.

References
HLSZ
Lombard FC Papa Official Website

1986 births
Living people
Sportspeople from Győr
Hungarian footballers
Association football forwards
Győri ETO FC players
Gyirmót FC Győr players
Lombard-Pápa TFC footballers
Rákospalotai EAC footballers
Veszprém LC footballers
Soproni VSE players
Nemzeti Bajnokság I players